The 2014 Letran Knights men's basketball team represented Colegio de San Juan de Letran in the 90th season of the National Collegiate Athletic Association in the Philippines. The men's basketball tournament for the school year 2014-15 began on June 28, 2014, and the host school for the season was Jose Rizal University.

The Knights finished the double round-robin eliminations at sixth place with 9 wins against 9 losses. This is the first time the Knights missed the Final Four playoffs since 2010.

Roster 

 Depth chart Depth chart

Roster changes 
The Knights have lost key players in Season 89 MVP Raymond Almazan, who was the third pick in the 2013 PBA Draft, and Jonathan Belorio, who had used up his eligibility. Holdovers were Mark Cruz, Kevin Racal, Rey Nambatac, and McJour Luib. Added to the roster was NCAA Season 88 juniors MVP Bong Quinto, Filipino-American Daryl Singontiko, and spitfire JP Calvo.

Suspensions 
NCAA Management Committee led by Mr. Bai Cristobal suspended Letran head coach Caloy Garcia for one game after Garcia received two technical fouls during the match against JRU Heavy Bombers in the first round of eliminations. Kevin Racal, Jamil Gabawan, Rey Nambatac, and Rey Publico  were given a stern warning for crossing over to the game officials prior to the league's 30-minute cooling period.
Letran point guard Mark Cruz was also suspended on the same day after he charged into the referee.

Injuries 
Kevin Racal suffered a torn anterior cruciate ligament (ACL) on his left knee during the team's practice a day before the game against the Arellano Chiefs.

NCAA Season 90 games results 

Elimination games were played in a double round-robin format. All games were aired on TV5 & AksyonTV.

Source: PBA-Online

References 

Letran Knights basketball team seasons